Georgi Donev (born 25 May 1958) is a Bulgarian wrestler. He competed in the men's Greco-Roman 57 kg at the 1980 Summer Olympics.

References

1958 births
Living people
Bulgarian male sport wrestlers
Olympic wrestlers of Bulgaria
Wrestlers at the 1980 Summer Olympics
Place of birth missing (living people)